Zraoua is a Tunisian village in the delegation of Matmata. The original name in Amazigh language is Azro. Beside the Berber tribes, there was installation of the Arab tribes of Ouled Abdallah and Ouled Hlel from Enfidha and Ouled Aïssa from the tribe of Hmamma.

See also
Zrawa language

References

This article is translated fully from the Arabic Wikipedia article. List of authors is here

Populated places in Gabès Governorate
Berbers in Tunisia
Communes of Tunisia
Tunisia geography articles needing translation from French Wikipedia